Sanyuan may refer to:

Sanyuan, Longshan County, township in Longshan County, Hunan, China
Sanyuan, Huilong a village in Huilong, Hanchuan, Xiaogan, Hubei, China
Sanyuan Bridge, overpass on the 3rd Ring Road, Beijing, China 
Sanyuan County, in Shaanxi, China
Sanyuan District, in Sanming, Fujian, China
Sanyuan Group, Chinese state-owned group of companies based on agriculture & animal-husbandry